Daniela Jadwiga Chrapkiewicz (born 9 March 1948 in Starogard Gdański) is a Polish politician. She was elected to the Sejm on 25 September 2005, getting 3,657 votes in 25 Gdańsk district as a candidate from the Law and Justice list.

See also
Members of Polish Sejm 2005-2007

External links
Daniela Chrapkiewicz - parliamentary page - includes declarations of interest, voting record, and transcripts of speeches.

1948 births
Living people
People from Starogard Gdański
Members of the Polish Sejm 2005–2007
Women members of the Sejm of the Republic of Poland
Law and Justice politicians
21st-century Polish women politicians
Members of the Polish Sejm 2011–2015